Yoshizawa (written: 吉沢, 吉澤 or 芳沢) is a Japanese surname. Notable people with the surname include:

, Japanese idol, singer and actress
, Japanese gravure idol and AV actress
, Japanese origamist
, stage name for several kabuki actors
, Japanese video game designer
, Japanese footballer and manager
, Japanese ski jumper
, Japanese football referee
, Japanese idol, singer and actress
, Japanese mountain climber
, Japanese speed skater
, Japanese hurdler
, Japanese diplomat
, Japanese American musician
, Japanese musician
, Japanese actor
, Japanese gravure idol
, Japanese footballer
, Japanese footballer

Japanese-language surnames